This is a list of football (soccer) clubs in Burkina Faso.
For a complete list see :Category:Football clubs in Burkina Faso

A
AS Maya
ASEC Koudougou
ASFA Yennenga

B
ASF Bobo
Bobo Sport
Bouloumpoukou FC

C
Commune FC

E
Étoile Filante de Ouagadougou

J
Jeunesse Club de Bobo Dioulasso

M
Majestic FC

R
RC Bobo
Rail Club du Kadiogo

S
Santos Ouagadougou FC
Silures Bobo Dioulasso
AS Sonabel
Sourou Sport de Tougan
Sanor de Sapone FC

U
USCO Banfora
US Ouagadougou
Union Sportive des Forces Armées
US FRAN
US Yatenga

Burkina Faso
Football clubs
 
Football clubs